Lamkani is a small village in the state of Maharashtra, India. It is located in the Dhule taluka of Dhule District in Maharashtra.
It was founded by the ancestors of Shrimant Raul Srujaansing Raje of the Parmar clan of Rajputs, the renowned Rajput Sardar in the Maratha history and close associate of Shrimant Chhatrapati Shahu, also one of the thirteen Vatandars of Khandesh, well-known in the history of Maharashtra as "Saadeybaaraa Raaul".

Location
Lamkani is located on the junction of Maharashtra State Highway 10 (SH 10) and 12 (SH 12). It is located at 210 05’17.37" N 74034’08.09" E.

Lamkani can  be reached from Dhule by taking National Highway (NH 3) up to Sarwad  village road junction (18 km) and then taking  State Highway  12 (SH 12) toward west direction that passes through Nandane, Burzad, and Boris village,  finally reaching  Lamkani. It is at a distance of 42 km by route, but this road is well maintained.
 
Alternately, Lamkani can be reached from Dhule city by Mehergaon route. One can go straight way  from Dhule by  State Highway 14 (SH 14) up to Mehergaon (18 km) and then taking SH 10 (15 km) that passes through Lamkani. It is at a distance of 33 km by this route and shorter by 9 km.

Climate 
Lamkani has three distinct seasons during the year: summer, winter, and the rainy season.

Summer months are hot and spread over  April, May and June. The day time temperature reaches up to 43 0 C.  May is the hottest month. Dusty and hot winds of varying velocity are common during summer. Winter is spread over November to mid-February. Winter temperature drops down to minimum 10 0 C. Snowfall and smog are unknown. However hailstorms of mild intensity are  occasionally  reported.

Rainy season starts by mid-June and lasts till September. The average  annual rain fall is   350 mm spread over about 45 rainy days. The nearest rain gauge station is at Dhule. Rains are received  from the South- West mansion winds.  Showers from North – East mansion are very rare. Lamkani has very erratic rainfall pattern. During the rainy monsoon season the skies are moderately  clouded. For the rest of the year skies are mostly clear.

During the South-West monsoon season the humidity is about 60 per cent. The air is dry during the rest of the year.

See also 
 List of villages in Dhule District
 List of districts of Maharashtra

External links 
 Census Of India: 2001: Census Data for Lamkani Village - Code 00146100
 Government of India: Ministry of Panchayati Raj

References

Villages in Dhule taluka
Villages in Dhule district